Polans may refer to two Slavic tribes:
 
 Polans (eastern), an East Slavic tribe which inhabited both sides of the Dnieper river from the 6th to the 9th century
 Polans (western), a West Slavic tribe in the area of Warta, which unified most of the lands of present-day Poland under the Piast dynasty

See also
 Polan (disambiguation)
 Opolans, a West Slavic tribe that lived in the region of upper Odra